The Tarkio Limestone is a member of the Zeandale Limestone formation of Kansas. It preserves fossils from the Carboniferous period.

See also

 List of fossiliferous stratigraphic units in Kansas
 Paleontology in Kansas

References
 

Carboniferous Kansas
Carboniferous southern paleotropical deposits